Paul Durand (1907–1977) was a French composer. He scored a number of films during the postwar era in France. He adapted the tune of "Bolero" for the 1950 hit song All My Love.

Selected filmography
 Donne-moi tes yeux (1943)
 La vie de plaisir (1944)
 Scandal on the Champs-Élysées (1949)
 The Girl from Maxim's (1950)
 No Vacation for Mr. Mayor (1951)
 Rasputin (1954)
 The Contessa's Secret (1954)
 Leguignon the Healer (1954)
 Mademoiselle from Paris (1955)
 The Whole Town Accuses (1956)
 Paris, Palace Hotel (1956)
A Kiss for a Killer (1957)
 The Cow and I (1959)
 Le Saint mène la danse (1960)
 The Old Guard (1960)
 Ravishing (1960)
 Un soir sur la plage (1961)
 Le captif (1962)

References

Bibliography
 Tyler, Don. Hit Songs, 1900-1955: American Popular Music of the Pre-Rock Era. McFarland, 2007.

External links

1907 births
1977 deaths
French composers
People from Sète